Reggie Aaron Christiansen (born August 28, 1975) is an American college baseball coach who has served as head coach of the Sacramento State Hornets baseball team since 2011. Christiansen was previously head coach at Menlo and South Dakota State. At Sacramento State, Christiansen has over 360 wins, with two Western Athletic Conference Coach of the Year honors in 2012 and 2014 and three appearances in the NCAA Tournament in 2014, 2017, and 2019.

Early life and education
Originally from Ferndale, California, Christiansen attended Menlo College, where he played on the Menlo Oaks baseball team at third base from 1996 to 1997. Christiansen graduated from Menlo in 1998 with a bachelor's degree in business administration.

Coaching career

Early coaching career (1998–2008)
After his playing career ended, Christiansen was assistant coach at Menlo in 1998 and 1999. In the spring of 2001, Christiansen was head baseball coach at Ferndale High School. Hired on September 1, 2001, Christiansen returned to Menlo College as head coach, with an 11-29 record in the 2002 season.

In 2003 and 2004, Christiansen was as an assistant coach at Kansas, in which the Jayhawks set several program offensive records and led the Big 12 in batting in the 2004 season.  He then served as head coach of the South Dakota State during its transition from Division II to Division I from 2005 to 2008.

Sacramento State assistant and head coach (2009–present)

From 2009 to 2010, Christiansen was an assistant at Sacramento State before being elevated to the top job beginning in 2011.

In 2012, Christiansen was the Western Athletic Conference (WAC) Coach of the Year for a turnaround season elevating Sacramento State from last place to regular season co-champions.

As of the 2021 season, Christiansen is 338–276 at Sacramento State with two regular season WAC titles (2012 and 2014), three WAC Tournament titles (2014, 2017, and 2019), and three NCAA Tournament appearances (2014, 2017, and 2019).

Head coaching record

See also
List of current NCAA Division I baseball coaches

References

Living people
1975 births
People from Fortuna, California
High school baseball coaches in the United States
Kansas Jayhawks baseball coaches
Menlo Oaks baseball coaches
Menlo Oaks baseball players
Sacramento State Hornets baseball coaches
South Dakota State Jackrabbits baseball coaches
University of Kansas alumni
People from Ferndale, California
Baseball coaches from California